The  (Union of Italian Hikers) is an independent and non-partisan mountaineering association.

It was founded on 29 June 1911.

References 

Hiking organizations